Estonia-Film was an Estonian film organization and film production company.

The company was established on 10 September 1920 by Brothers Parikas, and Konstantin and Theodor Märska.

In 1922, on the company's initiative, the cinema Rekord was established; a year later the cinema Kungla was established.

The company was liquidated in 1932. 

Film Estonia production incentive supports the production of feature films, feature documentaries, animation films, animation series, high-end TV-drama and the post-production of all beforementioned works

Filmography

 1929: 2 meest
 1929: IV Kaitseliidu päev Tallinnas ja Kaitseliidu suvelaagrid
 1930: Filmitäht Ita Rina Tallinnas
 1931: Tallinna vaated

References

Film production companies of Estonia